"Do for Love" (originally titled "Sucka 4 Luv" in its unreleased form) was the second posthumously released single by Tupac Shakur from his second posthumous album R U Still Down? (Remember Me). The vocal sample is from "What You Won't Do for Love" by Bobby Caldwell. The song was produced by Soulshock & Karlin. It charted at #21 on the Billboard Hot 100 in the US, and #12 in the UK.

Music video
The music video, directed by Bill Parker, was filmed on January 28–29, 1998, and has 2Pac as a clay, anime, and animated figure.

Sampling controversy
Producer J Dilla claimed that the producers Soulshock and Karlin had sampled and interpolated his remix of The Pharcyde's track "Y? (Be Like That)", but did not credit him or the Pharcyde in the liner notes in a 2003 interview.

Commercial performance
The song was certified Gold by RIAA on March 31, 1998 for 500,000 sales.

Charts and certifications

Weekly charts

Year-end charts

Certifications

References

1997 singles
Tupac Shakur songs
Songs released posthumously
Song recordings produced by Soulshock and Karlin
1997 songs
Songs written by Soulshock
Songs written by Kenneth Karlin
Animated music videos
Funk songs
Songs written by Tupac Shakur
Songs written by Bobby Caldwell